Erna Kamilla Schøyen (born Erna Kamille Berg, March 1, 1887 – December 21, 1968) was a Norwegian actress.

Career
Schøyen trained as an actress at the National Theatre from 1905 to 1906, and she had her debut at the Fahlstrøm Theater in 1906. She remained there until she relocated to the Central Theater in 1911, where she worked until 1959. Schøyen  was also engaged with Chat Noir from 1920 to 1924.

Schøyen also appeared in dozens of films, including some of Norway's first silent films. When Alice in Wonderland was dubbed into Norwegian in 1951, Schøyen played one of the voices. She was a master of the Northern Norwegian dialect and played the grandmother of Bodø (nicknamed after a town in northern Norway) in one of the Stompa films, based on the Jennings novels. Schøyen continued working until she was almost 80 years old.

Family
Schøyen was born Erna Kamille Berg in Kabelvåg to the bookseller Ørger Johannes Berg (1860–?) and Kamilla Hamine Benjaminsen (1865–1938). She married the entomologist Thor Hiorth Schøyen (1885–1961) on June 19, 1910. Their daughter was the actress Vivi Schøyen (1918–2014), who was the mother of the journalist Hege Duckert (born 1962).

Filmography

 1916: Under kjærlighedens aak
 1917: Synd skal sones
 1917: Livets gøglespil
 1917: Hjertetyven
 1936: Vi vil oss et land...
 1940: Tørres Snørtevold
 1941: Hansen og Hansen
 1943: Sangen til livet
 1943: Den nye lægen
 1944: Kommer du, Elsa?
 1946: Om kjærligheten synger de
 1946: To liv
 1948: Trollfossen
 1949: Svendsen går videre
 1951: Vi gifter oss
 1952: Trine!
 1956: Kvinnens plass
 1959: Hete septemberdager
 1960: Venner
 1961: Den store barnedåpen (TV)
 1961: Et øye på hver finger
 1962: Stompa & Co
 1963: Kranes konditori (TV)
 1964: Alle tiders kupp
 1964: Klokker i måneskinn
 1965: Hjelp – vi får leilighet!

References

External links

Erna Schøyen at the Swedish Film Database
 Erna Schøyen's family tree at Geni.com

1887 births
1968 deaths
20th-century Norwegian actresses
Norwegian stage actresses
Norwegian film actresses
Norwegian silent film actresses
People from Vågan